This is a list of all personnel changes for the 2014 NBA off-season and 2014–15 NBA season.

Retirement

Front office movements

Head coach changes

Off-season

Season

General manager changes

Off-season

Player movements

Trades

Free agency

Free agency negotiation starts on July 1, 2014, with players being able to sign starting July 10, after the July moratorium ends. The following players, who last played for an NBA team in 2013–14, are scheduled to become free agents. All players will be unrestricted free agents unless indicated otherwise. A restricted free agent's team has the right to keep the player by matching an offer sheet the player signs with another team.

* Player option
** Team option
*** Early termination option

Going overseas

Released

Waived

Note
 * Released under the amnesty clause in the CBA, which gives teams a one-time option to waive a player's remaining contract from the salary cap.

Training camp cuts
All players listed did not make the final roster.

Draft

2014 NBA draft
The 2014 NBA draft was held on June 26, 2014, at Barclays Center in Brooklyn, New York.

First round

Second round

Previous years' draftees

See also

Notes

References

External links
NBA Transactions at NBA.com
2014 Free Agent Tracker at NBA.com
NBA Transactions at ESPN.com

Transactions
2014-15